David Parlett (born 18 May 1939 in London) is a games scholar, historian, and translator from South London, who has studied both card games and board games. He is the president of the British Skat Association.

His published works include many popular books on games such as Penguin Book of Card Games, as well as the more academic volumes The Oxford Guide to Card Games and The Oxford History of Board Games, both now out of print. Parlett has also invented many card games and board games.  The most successful of these is Hare and Tortoise (1974). Its German edition was awarded Spiel des Jahres (Game of the Year) in 1979.

Parlett is a Quaker.

Books

Games and gaming
 All the Best Card Games
 Anarquía y Otros Juegos Sociales de Cartas
 Botticelli and Beyond
 Card Games for Everyone
 Family Card Games
 Know the Game: Patience
 Original Card Games
 Solitaire: Aces Up and 399 other Card Games
 Teach Yourself Card Games
 Teach Yourself Card Games for Four
 Teach Yourself Card Games for One
 Teach Yourself Card Games for Three
 Teach Yourself Card Games for Two
 Teach Yourself Poker and Brag
 The Guinness Book of Word Games
 The Oxford Dictionary of Card Games
 The Oxford Guide to Card Games / A History of Card Games
 The Oxford History of Board Games reprinted as History of Board Games 
 The Penguin Book of Card Games
 The Penguin Book of Patience
 The Penguin Book of Word Games
 The Penguin Encyclopedia of Card Games
 The Popular Dictionary of Card Games

Other subjects
 A Short Dictionary of Languages
 Dalcroze Today (translation of Marie-Laure Bachmann's work)
 Learning a Language Alone
 Selections from the Carmina Burana (translations)

Games invented

Board games
Since 1974, David Parlett has published numerous games, including the following:
 Around the World in 80 Days (2016)
 Asterix: Das Kartenspiel (1990)
 Chicken Out! (2017)
 Die Wilden Kerle (The Wild Kids) (2017)
 Hare and Tortoise (1973)
 Katarenga (Colorado) (2017)
 LifeCards
 Metal Mickey's All Around the House Game (1982)
 Ninety-Nine (1974) / Four Seasons (2016)
 Pot Black: Snooker Dice (1980)
 Rainbow Junior Scrabble (1989)
 Roman Poker (2015)
 Shoulder to Shoulder (1975)
 Star Wars: Duell der Mächte (2015)
 Sushi Spiel (Chinese Take-Away)
 The Gnümies Party Game (2001)
 The Puzzle of Oz (2012)
 Zoo Party / 7Safari (2000) / Alles für die Katz

Card games
Parlett has invented more than 70 original card games that can be played with a standard deck of playing cards.

Solitaire games
 Archway
 Black Hole
 Gay Gordons
 Penguin

References

External links
David Parlett's official website

Board game designers
Tabletop game writers
Card game historians
Living people
1939 births
British Quakers
Card game book writers
British game designers